Wollongong Wolves Football Club is an Australian semi-professional association football club based in Wollongong, in the Illawarra region of New South Wales. The club currently competes in the National Premier Leagues NSW, the second-tier of football in Australia. The club plays its home games at WIN Stadium.

The club has been successful throughout their history winning one continental championship, two NSL championships, three state championships and a National Premier Leagues title (2019)

The club was formed in 1980 and competed in the National Soccer League from 1981 until the competition ceased in 2004, with the exception of a brief stint in the NSW State League in 1987. The club's most successful period in the national tournament came at the turn of the century when they won two consecutive championships in 1999–2000 and 2000–01. As a result, the club qualified for the region's continental championship in 2001 which it also won. By doing so, the Wolves became only the second Australian club to win a continental double after South Melbourne FC achieved the same feat two years prior. Their success at this particular event qualified the club for the 2001 FIFA Club World Championship, however, this tournament would ultimately be cancelled.

The club then joined the state league in the 2005 as it failed to join the newly formed national competition, the A-League after their owners decided not to apply. In 2009, the club was in financial crisis and could only survive through community support. The club was re-branded as a not for profit organisation, run and owned by the community.

The Wollongong Wolves have traditionally competed in a red and white kit, like many other sporting teams in the region. The club has operated under the names Wollongong City (1981–1996), Wollongong Wolves (1996–2006), Wollongong FC (2007–2008), Wollongong Community FC (2009), South Coast Wolves FC (2010–2015) and will once again use the moniker Wollongong Wolves FC (from 2016). In April 2016 the club president declared a desire to enter the A-League as a Wollongong Franchise in the next 3–5 years.

History

Foundation
The club was founded in 1980 as Wollongong City specifically to compete in the National Soccer League (NSL). The club joined the competition in the 1981 season, to which they finished in 11th position. The club was relegated from the NSL after the 1986 season, as the league reduced in size for the 1987 season. During 1987, Wollongong competed in the NSW First Division, where they were crowned both premiers and champions. The club returned to the NSL in the 1988 season where they were crowned NSL premiers. However, the honour would be he last major title the club would receive for 11 years.

Championship years: 1999–2001
In 1996, the club renamed to Wollongong Wolves. In the 1999–2000 season the team finished the league in second position and after winning their semi-final match 2–1 against Carlton, Wolves were matched-up against Perth Glory in the 2000 NSL Grand Final. The grand final match went down as one of the best comebacks ever seen in Australian football. At half time Perth Glory were leading 3–0, but at 56 minutes the Wolves found a goal through Scott Chipperfield to make it 3–1. Matt Horsley gave the Wolves a sniff at a comeback when he put the ball in the back of the net in the 69th minute, but it wasn't until Paul Reid pulled the game right back when his strike in the 89th minute made the score line 3–3. After no goals were scored in extra time, the game was forced into a penalty shoot out. Wolves goalkeeper, Les Pogliacomi, pulled off two saves to win the match 7–6 on penalties and give the club's first nation championship title.

The Wolves followed up their past season win by again placing second in the 2000–01 NSL season. After downing South Melbourne 2–1 in a semi-final match, the Wolves found themselves in a second consecutive NSL Grand Final. The Wolves earned the right to host the grand final for 2001. However, it was decided by Soccer Australia that the final would be moved from Wollongong and instead be played at Parramatta Stadium in Sydney. The reason cited was that the 20,000 capacity at WIN Stadium was not large enough to host such an event. Ironically, the crowd attendance for the match was 13,400. The Wolves went on to claim their second NSL title and qualify for the 2001 Oceania Club Championship, defeating their semi-final opponents, South Melbourne, 2–1. Stuart Young and Sasho Petrovski were among the goal-scorers for the Wolves, scoring on the 56th and 57th minute marks.

In the 2001 Oceania Club Championship, the Wolves beating Tafea of Vanuatu 1–0 in the final. The Oceania Club Championship title, however, did not lead to them playing in the 2001 FIFA Club World Championship which was scheduled to be played in Spain, as FIFA had cancelled the Club World Championship due to financial reasons.

Demise of NSL, return to state league
After the demise of the national competition, the NSL, the Wolves moved into the NSW Premier League in the 2004–05 season. In 2007, Wollongong Wolves changed its name to Wollongong FC and won the Waratah Cup. The club secured a grand final win in the 2008 season. However, the win didn't prevent a financial crisis later in the year. The club had shown many financial losses including A$240,000 in debts and losses of players and coaches. It was later announced that the club would cease to exist and a new community organisation would be formed to ensure money problems would not plague the club in the future. The club was re-branded as Wollongong Community FC, a not for profit organisation, run and owned by the community.

After a dismal 2009 season, Wollongong Community FC requested a name change back to the former "Wolves" moniker, with the formal request being approved in November 2009, and the name South Coast Wolves adopted in 2010.

The Wolves competed in the inaugural 2014 FFA Cup, where they were eliminated from the round of 32 by Central Coast Mariners 1–0 in front of a crowd of 5,238 at WIN Stadium.

In July 2015, as part of the club's 35th anniversary celebrations, it was announced that along with a brand new club logo, the name of the club would also change from South Coast Wolves back to Wollongong Wolves. These changes will be brought in for the 2016 season onwards.

Wollongong qualified for the 2016 FFA Cup and drew A-League powerhouse Sydney FC in the Round of 32. The match, played on 10 August 2016 at WIN Stadium in front of 8,029 fans, saw the Sky Blues run out 3–0 victors, with two goals to Matt Simon and one to David Carney.

Colours, kit and emblem

Like many other teams from the Illawarra region, the Wolves have traditionally played in red and white. These colours are taken from the local floral emblem – the Illawarra Flametree – which is used by representative teams and sporting associations throughout the area. Variations of these colours have been used throughout the years. For the 1996–97 season, the first season with the official Wolves moniker, the club played in a predominantly red kit. The shirt was bright red with maroon paneling on the lower torso and collar. Both shorts and socks were also bright red. For the 2000–01 championship season the club had returned to bright red shirt with a white collar and black detailing on the shoulders. The shorts and socks were both white. In 2002–03 the club changed to black collar, shorts and socks, and the shirt bright red with white paneling down the sides. Generally the away kits have been all-white throughout much of the Wolves history. After the club's financial troubles of the 2009 season and the move to the new moniker South Coast Wolves, both the home and away kit evolved also. The club's home kit was an all-white shirt, red shorts and socks. The away kit was a yellow with blue collar and side paneling, blue shorts and socks. For the 2014 FFA Cup, the club played in an all-red kit with white detailing. As of the 2015 season the club are back playing in a red shirt, black shorts and white socks. The away kit is also predominantly all-white with black socks.

The club's emblem has evolved throughout the years also. The original crest featured a wolf facing forward standing on its forefeet with a football in front. "Wollongong Wolves" was titled in white against a red background above the wolf. From 1996 the emblem included only the head of a wolf looking head-on, framed with large text of "Wolves" with smaller text "Wollongong" above it. Above this sat a football. With the name change to South Coast Wolves, the wolf also changed orientation to face east. There was no framing, just text "South Coast" above and "Wolves" underneath the wolf. During 2013, a company set out to produce a new club crest, citing the crest lacked traditional themes present in clubs such as Manchester United, Inter Milan and Bayern Munich. They produced a simple logo of a wolf looking face on and created a simple crest to frame the wolf. The club announced it would adopt this design from the 2016 season with the addition of two gold stars and two silver stars to represent the national and state championships won.

The Wolves kits are currently manufactured by Puma and the kit main sponsor is MCR Multi Civil and Rail. The back of the kit sponsor for season 2018 is Central Data Networks (CDN).

Stadium

When Wollongong City was admitted into the NSL in 1981, the club played out of the Wollongong Showground and then in Corrimal before it made a home at Brandon Park, Fairy Meadow in 1988. The ground had a capacity of 15,000. However, this site was demolished in 2003 in order for the University of Wollongong to build their new Wollongong Innovation Campus. At the time, the Wolves had six years left on their lease to the ground, but had been promised to play out of WIN Stadium as co-tenants with NRL team, the St. George-Illawarra Dragons. The switch to WIN Stadium occurred in 2000 following the club's title-winning season. However, due to the demise of the NSL and the Lysaghts Oval fiasco followed by the former owners handing the club to the football community has left the Wolves homeless. The Wolves moved through various homegrounds, including Macedonia Park (Berkeley) and Wetherall Park (Primbee) before settling on John Crehan Park in Cringila as its base, which has a capacity of 7,500. The Wolves moved back to WIN Stadium on a part-time contract in 2014 before announcing a permanent move in the PS4 National Premier League NSW Men's 1 for the 2015 season. The club also announced it would move their training facilities to The Thomas Dalton Park Regional Sports Centre in Fairy Meadow.

Players

Current squad
As of 5 February 2022

Club officials

Coaching staff

Management
Chairman: Tory Lavalle
CEO: Strebre Delovski

Honours

Regional
National Premier Leagues NSW
Champions (2): 1987, 2008
Premiers (2): 1987, 2019
Waratah Cup
Champions (2): 1997, 2007

Domestic
National Soccer League
Champions (2): 1999–2000, 2000–01
Premiers (1): 1988
National Premier Leagues
Champions (1): 2019

Continental
OFC Champions League
Champions (1): 2001

See also
 List of Wollongong Wolves FC seasons
 South Coast A-League Bid

References

External links

 History of Wollongong/South Coast Wolves Soccer Kits

 
Association football clubs established in 1980
New South Wales Premier League teams
National Premier Leagues clubs
Soccer clubs in Wollongong
1980 establishments in Australia
OFC Champions League winning clubs